Jeffrey Dowdell (born 13 March 1987) is an Australian professional basketball player. Born in Cooma, New South Wales, he is a product of the Shoalhaven Tigers basketball program which has produced several NBL, WNBL, and NCAA players including his brother Ben who spent 2007–2011 attending Santa Clara University and playing for the Santa Clara Broncos.

Professional career
In 2005, Dowdell played his rookie NBL season with the Perth Wildcats at the age of 18, the same year he was named as NSW Junior Player of the Year. In his second NBL season with the Wildcats, he was named the club's Most Improved Player. He established himself as a regular part of the Wildcats rotation.

After the 2006–07 NBL season, Dowdell played for the Wanneroo Wolves in the State Basketball League, where he averaged 27.5ppg.

Dowdell left the Wildcats to play for the Townsville Crocodiles in the 2009–10 NBL season where he played 30 games, averaging 3.1 points, 1.8 rebounds and 0.3 assists per game for the season.

Following a single season with the Crocodiles, Dowdell signed to play for the Adelaide 36ers for the 2010–11 NBL season and played all 28 games for the 36ers and averaged 4.8 points, 2.6 rebounds and 0.7 assists per game.

After the 2010–11 season, Dowdell once again changed clubs, this time moving north to the Cairns Taipans.

At the end of 2011, the Adelaide Crows Football Club announced the signing of Jeff Dowdell's younger brother Ben to the rookie list. He has no AFL background and was signed purely for height, athleticism and potential.

In his 196-game NBL career, he is so far averaging 4.2 points and 2.3 rebounds per game.

References

External links
Profile at Eurobasket.com

1987 births
Living people
Adelaide 36ers players
Australian men's basketball players
Centers (basketball)
Perth Wildcats players
Power forwards (basketball)
Townsville Crocodiles players
People from Cooma
Basketball players from New South Wales
20th-century Australian people
21st-century Australian people